Michael Eric Hurst ONZM (born 20 September 1957) is a British-born New Zealand actor, director and writer. He is known internationally for acting in the television programs Hercules: The Legendary Journeys and companion series Xena: Warrior Princess as Iolaus. Most recently, he is known for his role in directing the Starz series Spartacus: Blood and Sand and Ash vs Evil Dead.

Biography
Hurst was born in Lancashire, England, the eldest of three brothers. When he was seven his family moved to Christchurch, New Zealand. He enrolled at Papanui High School, then University of Canterbury, but for only one year.

He is married to New Zealand actress Jennifer Ward-Lealand and they have two sons.

In 1984, Hurst won the lead role of David Blyth's Death Warmed Up, New Zealand's first splatter movie. The plot saw Hurst's character weathering institutionalisation, sundry wackos, and a motorcycle chase in the tunnels below Waiheke Island. The film won the grand prize at a fantasy film festival in Paris. The same year Hurst began playing drummer Dave Nelson over two series of Heroes, about a band searching for fame.

Crime thriller Dangerous Orphans (1986) is the first film in which Hurst co-starred with real-life partner Jennifer Ward-Lealand (he had already acted with her on-stage). Hurst's role was one of three grown orphans caught up in a mission to one-up various criminal figures; Ward-Lealand played romantic interest to one of the other orphans. Hurst would work with Ward-Lealand again on his next three features, 1992's The Footstep Man, 1993's Desperate Remedies and 1999's I'll Make You Happy. 

In 1993, he starred alongside Australian Sophie Lee and Brit Greg Wise in the TV thriller Typhon's People. Hurst played a European mystery man uncovering the truth behind corporate genetic meddling. The script was by author Margaret Mahy.

Hurst went on to co-star in Hercules: The Legendary Journeys with Kevin Sorbo, playing sidekick Iolaus to Sorbo's Hercules.

Hurst made his feature debut as a director with Jubilee (2000), based on the book by Nepi Solomon. The film stars Cliff Curtis as a kind-hearted procrastinator who gets the chance to prove himself by organising a 75th jubilee. Hurst followed Jubilee by directing Love Mussel, a one off satire for television. Written by Braindead'''s Stephen Sinclair and starring Kevin Smith, Love Mussel is a mockumentary about a fictional township which erects a monument to a shellfish with Viagra-like properties.

In 2003, Hurst was awarded an Arts Foundation of New Zealand Laureate Award. In the 2005 Queen's Birthday Honours, he was appointed an Officer of the New Zealand Order of Merit, for services to film and the theatre.

In 2015, after runs in New Zealand and at the 2014 Edinburgh Festival Fringe, Hurst directed The Generation of Z: Apocalypse at a purpose-built venue in East London between 4 April 2015 to July 2015. Hurst stated, "A lot of the reviews have said 'immersive theatre into overdrive'. 'Video game, only live.' It has those qualities. There are choices where the audience can affect the outcome of scenes which is quite a new thing. It flows very easily depending on which choice they make."

In October 2018, he was presented with a Scroll of Honour from the Variety Artists Club of New Zealand for his contribution to New Zealand entertainment.

He has also appeared in several solo stage productions including No Holds Bard (based on several Shakespearian characters) in 2018, and An Illiad'' in 2019.

Filmography

Starring roles

Guest-starring roles

Director
The numbers in directing credits refer to the number of episodes.

Producer

Writer

References

External links

 with curriculum vitae
Michael Hurst interview with his wife Jennifer Ward-Lealand for the Cultural Icons project. Audio and video.
Michael Hurst Now: Michael Hurst's Projects Since Hercules The Legendary Journeys
Maddigan's Quest: Official Site

1957 births
English male film actors
English male television actors
English male stage actors
English male voice actors
New Zealand male film actors
New Zealand male television actors
New Zealand male stage actors
New Zealand male soap opera actors
New Zealand male voice actors
Male actors from Lancashire
English emigrants to New Zealand
Living people
Officers of the New Zealand Order of Merit
University of Canterbury alumni
People educated at Papanui High School